{{Speciesbox
|image = Callicarpa Tomentosa 05.JPG
|genus = Callicarpa
|species = tomentosa
|authority = (L.) L.
|synonyms = *Callicarpa arborea Miq. ex C.B.Clarke [Invalid]  
Callicarpa farinosa  Roxb. ex C.B.Clarke [Invalid]  
Callicarpa lanata  L. [Illegitimate]  
Callicarpa lobata  C.B.Clarke  
Callicarpa tomentosa var. lanata  (L.) Bakh.  
Callicarpa tomex  Poir. [Illegitimate]  
Callicarpa villosa  Vahl  
Callicarpa wallichiana  Walp.  
Cornutia corymbosa  Lam. [Illegitimate]  
Hedyotis arborescens  Noronha [Invalid] 
Tomex tomentosa L.
|synonyms_ref = 
}}Callicarpa tomentosa'' is a species of beautyberry plant in the family Lamiaceae. It is found in Western Ghats of India and Sri Lanka. It is a small tree with about 5m tall. Leaves simple, opposite; elliptic to broadly elliptic; apex acute or acuminate. Purplish flowers show branched axillary cymes. Fruit is 3-4 seeded globose drupe. Fruits provide food for wildlife. They are sometimes used to make herbal medicine. The leaves are also food for wildlife.

The leaf is known being used as a wick to light an oil lamp.

In Hinduism, it is said in the legends that when the pandavas went to exile, they lit the tree by applying oil to the leaves and burning them.

Common Names
Sanskrit - Priyangu

Marathi - Jhijhak

Tamil - kattu-ke-kumil
Telugu - bodiga chettu

Kannada - Pandavara Batti

References

tomentosa
Flora of the Indian subcontinent
Flora of Myanmar
Flora of Thailand
Flora of Peninsular Malaysia
Taxa named by Carl Linnaeus